Peter Gerig (born 19 March 1934) is a Swiss biathlete. He competed in the 20 km individual event at the 1964 Winter Olympics.

References

1934 births
Living people
Swiss male biathletes
Olympic biathletes of Switzerland
Biathletes at the 1964 Winter Olympics
People from the canton of Uri